El Mundo is a daily morning newspaper in El Salvador.

It was first published on February 6, 1967, by Dr. Juan José Borga.  Several journalists who had worked at the Tribuna Libre joined the new paper, which was led by writer Waldo Chávez Velasco.

Originally an evening paper (published Monday to Saturday), it switched to morning publication in 2004.

A 1991 report described the paper as "less conservative" than the other leading daily papers in the country.

References

1967 establishments in El Salvador
Newspapers published in El Salvador
Newspapers established in 1967
Spanish-language newspapers